The Norman Rockwell Museum is an art museum in Stockbridge, Massachusetts, dedicated to the art of Norman Rockwell. It is home to the world's largest collection of original Rockwell art. The museum also hosts traveling exhibitions pertaining to American illustration.

History
The museum was founded in 1969 in Stockbridge, Massachusetts, where Rockwell lived the last 25 years of his life. Originally located on Main Street in a building known as the Old Corner House, the museum moved to its current location 24 years later, opening to the public on April 3, 1993. The current museum building was designed by 2011 Driheaus Prize winner and New Classical architect Robert A. M. Stern.

Collection
In addition to 574 original works of art by Rockwell, the museum also houses the Norman Rockwell Archives, a collection of more than 100,000 items, including photographs, fan mail, and various business documents. In 2014, the Famous Artists School donated its archives, including process drawings by Rockwell, who was one of its founding faculty members (in 1948), to the museum.

Works by Rockwell at the museum include:
Boy with Baby Carriage, 1916
No Swimming, 1921
Girl Reading the Post (1941) - In 1943, Rockwell gifted this painting to Walt Disney whose daughter, Diane Disney Miller, gifted it to The Norman Rockwell Museum at Stockbridge in 2000  Four Freedoms, 1943
 Freedom of Speech Freedom of Worship 
 Freedom from Want Freedom from Fear Going and Coming, 1947Christmas Homecoming, 1948Day in the Life of a Little Girl, 1952Girl at Mirror, 1954Art Critic, 1955Marriage License, 1955The Runaway, 1958Family Tree, 1959The Problem We All Live With, 1963Murder in Mississippi, 1965The Peace Corps (JFK's Bold Legacy), 1966Home for Christmas (Stockbridge Main Street at Christmas)'', 1967

The museum also houses the Rockwell Center for American Visual Studies, a national research institute dedicated to American illustration art.

Awards and grants

In 2008, the museum received the National Humanities Medal from the National Endowment for the Humanities. In 2016, the museum received a grant of $1.5 million from the George Lucas Family Foundation, which will be used by "the museum's digital learning and engagement division to create multimedia experiences."

See also
 List of single-artist museums

References

Further reading

External links 
 
Norman Rockwell Museum within Google Arts & Culture

Art museums and galleries in Massachusetts
Rockwell
Museums in Stockbridge, Massachusetts
Artists' studios in the United States
Norman Rockwell
National Humanities Medal recipients
Art museums established in 1969
1969 establishments in Massachusetts
Rockwell, Norman
Robert A. M. Stern buildings
New Classical architecture